"SOS" is a song by Swedish pop group ABBA. It was released in June 1975 as the fifth single from their self-titled 1975 album. 

It was released with "Man in the Middle" as the B-side. Agnetha Fältskog, who sang lead, recorded the song in Swedish on her 1975 solo album Elva kvinnor i ett hus. "SOS" was ABBA's first major worldwide hit since "Waterloo".

History
"SOS" (working title; "Turn Me On") was written by Benny Andersson, Björn Ulvaeus and Stig Anderson and was recorded at Glen Studio in Långängen, Sweden on 22–23 August 1974. The title itself was coined by Stig, though the lyrics he provided were re-written by Ulvaeus. "SOS" was among the first of three songs recorded for the group's 1975 album, ABBA and the opening track of their classic Greatest Hits LP released at the end of the same year.

The song opens with a piano intro, followed by the first verse sung by Fältskog. Biographer Carl Magnus Palm described it as 'Agnetha's first 'heartbreak classic, wherein the tear-filled vocal delivery, her trademark, would blend a pop melody, with a dash of melancholy. The song features a heavy influence from the Wall of Sound instrumentation of Phil Spector and the melodies of the Beach Boys.

Lyricist Ulvaeus has said that, after three years of trying to figure out what style would define them, ABBA found its identity as a pop group with the release of "SOS", while Palm described it as 'pure ABBA'.

During the band's first visit to the United States, ABBA performed "SOS" on the long-running television programs American Bandstand and Saturday Night Live on 15 November 1975. The promotional video was directed by Lasse Hallström and released in the same year, along with the single. The video and three others (for "I Do, I Do, I Do, I Do, I Do", "Mamma Mia" and "Bang-A-Boomerang"), were completed in two days for a total cost of Kr 50,000 (£5,500). The video was uploaded to YouTube on 8 October 2009, on the AbbaVEVO channel, and has 65 million views as of September 2021.

The song is also featured in the concert film ABBA: The Movie (1977), "Good Night Oppy (2022)", and Live at Wembley Arena, released in 2014.

Reception

"SOS" marked a significant turnaround in ABBA's fortunes and returned them to the Top 10 in many countries. Reaching #6 and #4 respectively, "SOS" started a run of 18 consecutive Top 10 hits for ABBA in the UK and Ireland. "SOS" reached #1 in Australia, Belgium, France, West Germany (where it spent 7 weeks at the top), New Zealand and South Africa, and was a Top 3 hit in Austria, the Netherlands, Norway, Italy (where it became ABBA's most successful hit), Mexico, Rhodesia and Switzerland. The song also became ABBA's second Top 20 hit in the United States, peaking at #15.

As of September 2021, it is ABBA's 19th-biggest song in the UK, including both pure sales and digital streams.

Chicago radio station WLS, which gave "SOS" much airplay, ranked the song as the 61st biggest hit of 1975. It peaked at number six on their survey of 22 November 1975.

"SOS" has been recorded and performed in concert by several prominent artists, including John Frusciante, Peter Cetera, Chris deBurgh, Cher, Portishead, Fozzy, and Canadian rock group Headstones. English synth-pop duo Erasure covered SOS and three other Abba songs on their 1992 E.P. Abba-Esque, reaching number one in the UK singles chart.

Ray Davies of The Kinks said that he was taken with the song after seeing the group perform it on the BBC television show Seaside Special. Pete Townshend said the song had "a great sound". 

American singer-songwriter and former Czars frontman John Grant has called "SOS" "one of the greatest pieces of music ever made", adding that Agnetha Fältskog's "perfect" lyrical interpretation and emotional delivery is "a beautiful thing". British conductor and producer Charles Hazlewood called the song's "supersonic" transition from an acoustic D-minor key to an electric rock motif "absolutely genius".

Sex Pistols bassist Glen Matlock has claimed to have been inspired to write the main riff of Pretty Vacant after hearing "SOS" on a jukebox.

ABBA's performance of "SOS" on American Bandstand in 1975 has been included on lists of the most significant performances in the show's 31 seasons by several reviewers and critics. Bill Lamb put the song at number five, as did Alicia Diaz Dennis and Andres Jauregui.

ABBA performed "SOS" on episode five of the inaugural season of the long-running comedy-variety show Saturday Night Live (SNL) on 15 November 1975. SNL head writer Michael O'Donoghue staged the performance on a set of the deck of the Titanic and continued the sketch while the band were performing, according to bandleader Paul Shaffer, "They kept on singing like the pros that they are."

To date, the song is the only US Hot 100 or UK Official Charts single (or #1 single in Australia) in which both the title and the credited act (and also the album and the musical genre) are palindromes.

Track listing

Personnel
 Agnetha Fältskog - lead vocals
 Anni-Frid Lyngstad – backing vocals
 Björn Ulvaeus – guitar
 Benny Andersson – keyboards, synthesizer

Chart performance

Weekly charts

Year-end charts

Certifications and sales

Swedish version by Agnetha Fältskog

Agnetha Fältskog's version was the second single from her fifth Swedish solo-album Elva kvinnor i ett hus (Eleven Women in One House). It was the only song from this album not to have been composed by Fältskog herself. 

Despite the fact that Fältskog never promoted the single in Sweden, it peaked at No. 4 on the singles chart on 1 January 1976 during a 20-week chart run, and it also became Fältskog's third No. 1 on radio chart Svensktoppen, entering the chart on 22 November 1975 and spending a total of eleven weeks on the listing. 

The B-side of the single, "Visa I Åttonde Månaden" (Song in the Eighth Month) was a song written from a very personal perspective, as it was composed during Fältskog's pregnancy with daughter Linda Ulvaeus in 1973.

Cher version

American singer Cher's version was the second single from her 2018 album Dancing Queen. It was released on 23 August 2018. The song peaked at number 56 in the Scottish singles chart in August of that year.

Critical reception

Writing for Rolling Stone, Brittany Spanos felt that "working with producer Mark Taylor who helped seal Cher’s legacy with the game-changing "Believe" in the late Nineties, she finds subtle changes that update ABBA classics without totally stripping them of the catchiness that made those songs beloved hits well beyond their heyday. "Gimme! Gimme! Gimme! (A Man After Midnight)," "SOS" and "Mamma Mia" are given just enough of a knob turn that they're transformed from upbeat FM radio pop into club bangers, pulsating with every beat."

Music video

An accompanying music video for "SOS" was directed by Jake Wilson, and was premiered through Cher's official YouTube channel on 18 September 2018. The video features Rumer Willis, singer Betty Who, Transparent star Trace Lysette, comedian Sabrina Jalees, Elena of Avalor voice actor Aimee Carrero and Crazy Ex-Girlfriend cast member Vella Lovell. It was styled by fashion director William Graper in a similar fashion to the original ABBA video. It was also listed as the 18th best music video of 2018 by Paper. Roytel Montero said that "in a studied homage to the original ABBA classic from 1975, [the] interpretation of the video renders it a poignant call to female solidarity".

Live performances

Cher appeared on The Ellen Show on 7 September 2018, to promote her ABBA tribute album, Dancing Queen. During her appearance on Ellen, Cher also performed her rendition of ABBA’s "SOS" and discussed her upcoming world tour. During her Here We Go Again Tour she performs "SOS" together with "Waterloo" and "Fernando". On 31 October 2018 "The Shoop Shoop Song (It's in His Kiss)" and "Take Me Home" were cut from her Classic Cher concert residency and "Waterloo", "SOS" and "Fernando" were added.

Track listings and formats

Digital download
 "SOS" – 3:22

Credits and personnel
Credits for Dancing Queen adapted from AllMusic.

Management
 Published by Universal Songs of PolyGramInt., Inc. (ASCAP) and EMI Grove Park Music Inc. (BMI)
 Recorded by Mark Taylor and Paul Meehan at Metrophonic Studios, London
 Mixed at by Matt Furmidge and Mark Taylor at Metrophonic Studios, London
 Mastered by Sthephen Marcussen Mastering, Hollywood, CA

Personnel
 Cher – primary vocals
 Benny Andersson – songwriter
 Stig Anderson – songwriter
 Björn Ulvaeus – songwriter
 Ash Soan – drums
 Adam Phillips – guitars
 Hayley Sanderson – backing vocals
 Andy Caine – backing vocals

Charts

References

External links
 

1975 singles
1970s ballads
2018 singles
ABBA songs
Agnetha Fältskog songs
Cher songs
Number-one singles in Australia
Number-one singles in Belgium
Number-one singles in France
Number-one singles in Germany
Number-one singles in New Zealand
Number-one singles in South Africa
Polar Music singles
Pop ballads
Oricon International Singles Chart number-one singles
Songs written by Benny Andersson and Björn Ulvaeus
Songs written by Stig Anderson
Music videos directed by Lasse Hallström
1975 songs
Song recordings with Wall of Sound arrangements